William A. Newman (born 1948 in Great Lakes, IL) is an American painter and computer artist residing in Washington, D.C.

College 
Newman received his BFA at the Maryland Institute College of Art for Painting. His early medical studies were of great influence to his later paintings at MICA, which often involved bloody, gruesome scenes. Joe Shepard, Newman's painting teacher taught him the technique of laying glazes of transparent color over imprimatura (monochromatic underpaintings). Newman continued to use this technique throughout his career.

After his undergraduate years at MICA, in 1971, Newman spent one year running the Art Store at the Corcoran School of Art. During this time, he met many young artists, with whom he would create the group "The Washington Color Pencil School". These artists also organized an exhibit of the same name at the Corcoran Gallery of Art In 1973.

In 1973, Newman began studying for his MFA at University of Maryland, where he began teaching his first courses.

Lady Sarah controversy 
In 1975, Newman had already begun as a full-time teacher at the Corcoran School of Art. He was hired to paint a mural at the Construction site across from the Old Executive Office building, where he and twenty students created 35 - 40 magnified insects and animals and cut them out of plywood to place around the site. Since that project was a great success, Newman offered to create a painting for the inside of the building of a large nude. They accepted his proposal, so he began working. When he was finished, the painting was twenty four feet long. When the General Services Administration came to the Corcoran before it went up, they decided not to show the original piece. They refused to put the piece up, unless Newman painted a bathing suit over the woman in the mural.

"At the time I was just thinking, great, I'll paint a bathing suit on it, but that bathing suit is coming off as soon as it rains. I mixed tempera paint with that famous Corcoran bathroom soap, and I knew it would wash off right away. I told Paul Richard, the art writer at the Washington Post, about it, and he wrote a story titled "Praying for Rain." The painting came to be called Lady Sarah, named after its model."-William Newman: Peripheral Vision

During the first night it was up, rain fell. There was a line of about 300 people waiting to look through the peephole, in reaction to the article. 
Before the bathing suit could be completely washed off by the rain, the piece was taken down. Newman washed off the soap bathing suit and repainted it to become permanently present. He gave the piece to the Corcoran to raise money.

Reaction to Lady Sarah 
The National Organization for Women very publicly opposed of the mural and there was a piece written about it in Time Magazine.

Other controversy 
In 1984, there was a construction wall in D.C. that was opened up to the art community for anyone who wanted to create work on it. There were several people who participated, and Newman was one of them, creating a mural of Ronald Reagan's face looking up into the sky. On the top and bottom of the painting the phrase "5 Minutes" was also painted. This was a reference to a televised interview, where Ronald Reagan didn't realize he was live on the air when he said, "I'm going to blow up Russia in five minutes."

"The Monday morning after we painted it, Diana McClellan put a little picture of the Reagan mural in The Washington Times, with a witty remark about it bothering someone down the street. The next day a friend called and told me that somebody had brought furniture and cardboard boxes out from the Federal Trade Commission Building and pulled them in front of our Reagan mural. I hadn't taken a picture of it yet, so I came down and moved the office furniture to the side and took pictures. I was greeted by a top official from the Federal Trade Commission who said that he and his co-workers liked the portrait, but, as he pointed toward the White House, they didn't. The next day, the furniture was gone, but the mural was papered over. We easily removed the paper, to the applause of the Federal Trade Commission workers. The following day I got a call from the same friend who told me that a large flatbed Army truck with a crew of uniformed soldiers was dismantling the wall. We were unable to find the whereabouts of the mural or who actually gave the order to have it taken down." - William Newman: Peripheral Vision.

The mural was later to be placed on the cover of the New Art Examiner magazine in November 1984.

References 

Shmidt, Stacey. William Newman: Peripheral Vision. Washington D.C.: Corcoran Gallery of Art, 2002.
"Politics vs. Art: Who wins?" The New Art Examiner. November 1984.
Buchwald, Art. "Loves the School". Washington, DC. Corcoran School of Art, 1976.

External links 
 Access Living: William A. Newman
 William A. Newman's Website

1948 births
Living people
American male painters
Digital artists
Corcoran School of the Arts and Design faculty
Maryland Institute College of Art alumni
University System of Maryland alumni
University System of Maryland faculty
People from Great Lakes, Illinois
Painters from Illinois
20th-century American painters
21st-century American painters
21st-century male artists